This page details the players to have played for the North Wales Crusaders club.

All players
List of players with appearance number. If two players made their début during the same game shirt numbers will decide which player comes first.

Last updated on 2 September 2012.

Current squad

References

Lists of rugby league players